WBGF is a radio station serving the West Palm Beach, Florida market.

Other uses
Long Lellang Airport, with ICAO airport code WBGF
World Backgammon Federation (WBGF)